La Bâtiaz Castle (French: Château de la Bâtiaz) is a castle in the municipality of Martigny, in the Canton of Valais, Switzerland.  It is a Swiss heritage site of national significance.

The garderobes (toilets) at La Bâtiaz played a part in determining that the architect for the UNESCO listed castles in Wales came from Savoy before working in Wales. Historian and custodian A. J. Taylor travelled to La Bâtiaz and noticed that the castle and the one at Harlech shared one unique feature, the design of their toilets. The discovery enabled Taylor to confirm that James of Saint George had been the architect of both.

See also
 List of castles in Switzerland
 Château

References

Cultural property of national significance in Valais
Castles in the canton of Valais
13th-century establishments in Switzerland
Martigny
Hill castles